Eoophyla angustalis is a moth in the family Crambidae. It was described by Sauber in 1902. It is found on Mindanao in the Philippines.

References

Eoophyla
Moths described in 1902